Thin Solid Films is a peer-reviewed scientific journal published 24 times per year by Elsevier. It was established in July 1967. The current editor-in-chief is J. E. Greene (University of Illinois at Urbana–Champaign).

Aims and scope 
The journal covers research on thin-film synthesis, characterization, and applications, including synthesis, surfaces, interfaces, colloidal behavior, metallurgical topics, mechanics (including nanomechanics), electronics, optics, optoelectronics, magnetics, magneto-optics, and superconductivity.

Abstracting and indexing 
The journal is indexed and abstracted in:
 Cambridge Scientific Abstracts
 Chemical Abstracts
 Chemical Abstracts Service
 Current Contents/Engineering, Computing & Technology
 Current Contents/Physical, Chemical & Earth Sciences
 Engineering Index
 Inspec
 Metals Abstracts
 PASCAL
 Physikalische Berichte
 Science Citation Index
 Scopus
According to the Journal Citation Reports, the journal has a 2020 impact factor of 2.183.

References

External links 
 

Elsevier academic journals
Biweekly journals
Publications established in 1967
English-language journals
Materials science journals